Orocue Airport  is an airport serving Orocué, a town and municipality in the Casanare Department of Colombia. The runway is adjacent to the western edge of the town, north of the Meta River.

See also

Transport in Colombia
List of airports in Colombia

References

External links

SkyVector – Orocue
OurAirports – Orocue
OpenStreetMap – Orocue

Airports in Colombia
Buildings and structures in Casanare Department